Britten's War Requiem (1963) is the first recording of Benjamin Britten's War Requiem. It featured Galina Vishnevskaya, Dietrich Fischer-Dieskau and Peter Pears with the London Symphony Orchestra, the Melos Ensemble, The Bach Choir and the Highgate School Choir, and was conducted by Britten himself. The recording took place in the Kingsway Hall in London and was produced by John Culshaw for Decca. Within five months of its release in May 1963 it sold 200,000 copies, an unheard-of number for a piece of contemporary classical music at that time.

Performers
Britten wrote the music with the soloists in this recording in mind. He did not originally intend to have a female soloist, but hearing Vishnevskaya sing at Aldeburgh inspired him to include one.

Fischer-Dieskau and Pears sang at the first performance; however, Vishnevskaya was unable to perform due to visa restrictions imposed by the Soviet Union, because the piece was seen as "too political". She was, however, permitted to perform in the recording sessions, meaning Britten's intended lineup of a singer from each of Russia, Germany and the UK was achieved.

Recording producer John Culshaw reports that Vishnevskaya threw a tantrum during the recording, as she believednot having performed the work beforeshe was being insulted by being placed with the choir instead of at the front with the male soloists. The following day she returned, apparently transformed.

Recording setup
Culshaw praised Britten for his understanding of the possibilities and limitations of the technical side of stereo recording. They discussed the recording setup in depth and placed each of the three distinct forcesBritten wrote the piece in three distinct planes or levelsin appropriate locations. The two male soloists, representing two soldiers, and the chamber orchestra which accompanies them were placed to the right of the space in a dry acoustic to capture verbal clarity and to more accurately portray Britten's directions in the score, which frequently called for a "cold" tone from the string players. The large forces of the Mass itself (soprano soloist, chorus and orchestra) were placed in the centre of the hall with the chorus in the gallery which gave the desired level of reverberation, implying the large space of a cathedral without losing too much definition. The boys chorus and small organ were placed to the left of the space to create the sense of distance Britten wanted.

Rehearsal taping
During rehearsals John Culshaw surreptitiously taped footage which was presented as a special vinyl record with its own catalogue number, BB50, to Britten on his 50th birthday. Britten was not particularly happy about this invasion of his privacy and the present was not positively received. Despite his initial negativity Britten later sent a postcard to John Culshaw thanking him for his "intelligent and thoughtful work on it". The tape was kept in a cupboard at Britten's home, The Red House, Aldeburgh and was first revisited for the 1999 Decca reissue.

Cover design
The striking and simple box design of the original record, which has been retained in reissues, has been frequently praised and attributed to helping the early success of the record. The design was initially conceived by Boosey & Hawkes for the published scores.

Reception
The recording was exceptionally well received. Gramophone, in their review of the first release, praised John Culshaw and his team and said "the stereo reproduces the three different planes of sound even more convincingly than any 'live' performance could". At the 1963 Grammy Awards the recording won Classical Album of the Year

References

External links
 Decca Classics; 2013 remaster

Benjamin Britten albums
United States National Recording Registry recordings